San Sebastián de Yalí is a municipality in the Jinotega department of Nicaragua.

There is a website dedicated to helping Yali .

Municipalities of the Jinotega Department